Heinrich Dreser (1 October 1860 – 21 December 1924) was a German chemist responsible for the aspirin and heroin projects at Bayer AG. He was also a key figure in creating the widely used modern drug codeine. Dreser was born in Darmstadt.

Arthur Eichengrün made the claim, yet unproven, that credit for the discovery of aspirin were stolen from him by Dreser.

External links

References

19th-century German chemists
1860 births
1924 deaths
Bayer people
Scientists from Darmstadt
20th-century German chemists